Caloptilia aurantiaca is a moth of the family Gracillariidae. It is known from Madeira and the Canary Islands.

The larvae feed on Hypericum canariense, Hypericum glandulosum, Hypericum inodorum and Hypericum reflexum. They mine the leaves of their host plant. The mine starts as an epidermal corridor, but later becomes a shallow tentiform mine. In the end, the larva lives freely under a folded leaf tip.

References

aurantiaca
Moths described in 1858
Insects of the Canary Islands
Arthropods of Madeira
Moths of Africa